BukTeng is a small town located in Ulang County, South Sudan. It is situated approximately 10 kilometers south of Jikmir. BukTeng has a population of approximately 2,000 to 3,000 people, primarily from the Nuer ethnic group.

Geography 

BukTeng is situated on a flat plain, surrounded by grasslands and scattered trees. The town is located near the Gilo River, which provides water for drinking and irrigation. Key towns bordering BukTeng include Makak, Jikmir, and Kuanythony Nyang. Grid Coordinate:.

History 
In recent years, BukTeng has been affected by the ongoing civil war in South Sudan and global warming. Due to the armed conflict and extreme floods, the town has experienced displacement of its population during the rainy seasons.

Economy 
Agriculture is the main source of income for the people of BukTeng. The town is known for its production of sorghum, maize, and other cereals. Fishing is also an important economic activity, with the Gilo River providing a source of fish.

Infrastructure 
BukTeng has limited infrastructure, with no paved roads or electricity.

References
South Sudan: Nasir County Map
The World Factbook: South Sudan
BukTeng: A town caught up in South Sudan's conflict

References

Populated places in South Sudan